Floorball in India is governed by the Indian Floorball Federation.  It was created in 2001, but the National Floorball Championships were held before that time. The 13th National Championships were held in January 2019.

The Indian Floorball Federation is a member of the International Floorball Federation and has participated in international competitions called 'international friendlies'.

Clubs 
Delhi Strikers FBC
MP Smashers FBC
UP Quick Silver FBC
Haryana Warriors FBC
Punjab Lions FBC
Ranchi Pirates FBC
Mohun Bagan A.C.
East Bengal F.C.
 Bengaluru F.C.
Dempo S.C.
Minerva Punjab F.C
Salgaocar F.C.
Chennaiyin F.C.
Aizawl F.C.
Churchill Brothers F.C.
Jagatjit Cotton & Textile F.C.

References

External links 
 Indian Floorball Federation

Sport in India